Seeds of Change: Five Plants That Transformed Mankind is a 1985 book by Henry Hobhouse which explains how the history of the world since Columbus linked America to Europe has been changed by five plants.  It describes how mankind's discovery, usage and trade of sugar, tea, cotton, the potato, and quinine have influenced history to make the modern world.

In the second edition of the book,  Seeds of Change: Six Plants that Transformed Mankind, he adds the coca plant to the list.  In 2004, he published a follow-up book Seeds of Wealth: Four Plants That Made Men Rich covering timber, wine, rubber, and tobacco.

Reception
David E. Allen writing in Medical History described it as "a thoughtful, thought-provoking, extremely readable work"
It has been recommended reading and studied at universities and has been reviewed by the Library Journal, The American Historical Review,  and The Atlantic.

References

External links
Seeds of change. Six plants that transformed mankind

1985 non-fiction books
20th-century history books
Books about economic history
Books about the history of science
Botany books
Eurasian history
History books about agriculture
Popular science books
Sidgwick & Jackson books
Works about the theory of history